Jaroslav Sadílek (28 April 1913 – 6 February 1993) was a Czech figure skater. He competed in the men's singles event at the 1936 Winter Olympics.

References

External links
 

1913 births
1993 deaths
Czech male single skaters
Olympic figure skaters of Czechoslovakia
Figure skaters at the 1936 Winter Olympics
Place of birth missing